Ayersville High School is a public high school in Highland Twp. near Defiance, Ohio.  It is the only high school in the Ayersville Local School district.  Their mascot is the Pilots.  They are a member of the Green Meadows Conference.  Their fight song is “On to Victory” played to the tune of "On Wisconsin", the University of Wisconsin fight song.

Ohio High School Athletic Association State Championships

 Boys Basketball – 1957, 1961 
 Boys Baseball – 1997 
 Boys Cross Country – 1975 
 Girls Track and Field – 1996

Individual State Champions

Wrestling 
Cade Mansfield 2012 Weight class: 120

Cross Country 
Noah Fisher, 2018

Jim Jurcevich, 1993

Bill Ankney, 1975

Track & Field 
Jason Jackson, 2002, High Jump

Sarah Dewolfe, 1996, 100m Dash - 200m Dash - 400m Dash

Jim Jurcevich, 1993, 3200m, 1994 - 3200m

Notable alumni
 Chad Reineke, Current MLB player (San Diego Padres, Oakland Athletics, Cincinnati Reds)
Dan Neff, 1961 Class A Boys Basketball Player of the Year

Dan Neff, 1962 Class A Boys Basketball Player of the Year

External links
 District Website

References

High schools in Defiance County, Ohio
Public high schools in Ohio